The Philippine Army was established on December 21, 1935, as the Army of the Philippines, with a general headquarters in Manila, and units and formations based throughout the provinces of the Philippines.

The Philippine Army was initially organized under the National Defense Act of 1935  (Commonwealth Act No. 1) that formally created the Armed Forces of the Philippines.

Certain components of the Armed Forces of the Philippines were under the control of the United States Army Forces in the Far East (USAFFE) from 1941 to 1946, after the entry of the U.S. into World War II.

Origin 
Before the establishment of the Commonwealth Government in 1935, no effort was made for self-defense by Philippine forces since the United States assumed responsibility for the defense of the islands. An immediate concern of the commonwealth government was the defense of an emerging nation. President-elect Manuel L. Quezon convinced his friend, General Douglas MacArthur (Chief of Staff of the U.S. Army), to organize a national army with Franklin D. Roosevelt's agreement in the summer of 1935. MacArthur had unusually-broad authority to deal with the Secretary of War and the Chief of Staff as military adviser to the commonwealth government to organize a Philippine national army.

MacArthur had broad authority to deal with the United States Secretary of War, his successor as the Army Chief of Staff, and the United States Army Philippine Department and its commander Major General Lucius R. Holbrook (who had been told that his most important peacetime mission was to assist MacArthur in forming a Philippine force capable of defending the islands). MacArthur selected Majors Dwight D. Eisenhower and James B. Ord as his assistants; they and a committee at the Army War College prepared plans for the defense of the Philippine Commonwealth, with a target of independence in 1946. The plan called for a small regular army with divisions of about 7,500 men, conscription of all men between twenty-one and fifty years of age and a ten-year training program to build a reserve army, a small air force and a fleet of torpedo boats capable of repelling an enemy.

The National Assembly of the Philippines' first act was the passage of the National Defense Act on December 21, 1935, with initial plans for a 10,000-man regular force based on the incorporation of the Philippine Constabulary, a 400,000-man reserve force by 1946, and a West-Point-type military academy in Baguio on Luzon. Quezon noted that there was inadequate funds and time to build an effective naval defense force; the act provided for no navy, but an Offshore Patrol within the army. The offshore patrol would be based on British-designed fast torpedo boats, with an anticipated thirty-six boats under contract by 1946. The Philippine Army Air Corps would, by that time, have about 100 bombers and additional tactical aircraft in support of the offshore patrol in coastal defense. The Commonwealth would have ten military districts (comparable to corps areas in the United States), each able to provide an initial reserve division (growing to three) with full development of the reserve force. In a 1936 speech MacArthur described the force's function as making an invasion so costly that no nation would make the attempt, emphasizing the islands' terrain as making penetration nearly impossible.

Development was slow; 1936 was largely devoted to building camps and facilities, with the first conscripts called up on January 1, 1937. A major problem was the formation of a military-officer corps, with constabulary officers trained in law enforcement and limited numbers of Philippine Scouts officers becoming senior officers in the new force. By the end of 1939, the reserve force numbered 104,000 men and 4,800 officers. The Philippine Army Air Corps had about forty planes and a hundred trained pilots by 1940. The offshore patrol's development was more problematic, with only two British boats delivered before the war in Europe cut off further deliveries and a struggle to build boats under license locally produced only one boat by October 1941. President Quezon and others recognized that the naval defense was inadequate protection against a first-rate naval power, but the Philippines had neither the money nor industrial base to provide adequate naval force and relied on the assumption that the United States Navy would not idly stand by if the Philippines were attacked.

When the war with Japan began, the Philippine Army was six years from its founding in December 1935 and about five years from the 1946 date at which it was to be fully operational. The naval force which was to protect it against a first-rate naval power was in ruins at Pearl Harbor; the Japanese had pilots standing by fueled-and-loaded bombers in Formosa, prepared to strike the Philippines.

History

Initial establishment and training 
The Army of the Philippines was initially organized under the National Defense Act of 1935 (Commonwealth Act No. 1), of December 21, 1935. The Act specified that presidential appointments to grades above third lieutenant should be made from former holders of reserve commissions in the United States Army and former Philippine Scouts and Constabulary officers.

After the establishment of the commonwealth, Manuel L. Quezon, its first president, sought the services of General Douglas MacArthur to evolve a national-defense plan. On December 21, 1935, the Army of the Philippines was established. The act set forth the organizational structure of the army and enlistment and mobilization procedures.

The army's development was slow. In 1936 a general headquarters and camps were built, cadres were organized and instructors, drawn largely from the Philippine Constabulary, were trained. The commander of the Philippine Department provided Philippine Scouts as instructors and detailed U.S. Army officers to assist in the inspection, instruction and administration of the program. By the end of the year, instructors were trained and camps (including general headquarters) established.

The first group of 20,000 to 40,000 men was called up on January 1, 1937, and by the end of 1939 there were 4,800 officers and 104,000 men in the reserves. Infantry training was provided at camps throughout the Philippines; field-artillery training was concentrated near the U.S. Army's Fort Stotsenburg (near Angeles in the province of Pampanga, about fifty miles north of Manila) and specialized training was provided at Fort William McKinley, south of Manila. Coast artillery instruction was carried out at Fort Stotsenburg and Grande Island, in Subic Bay, by personnel supplied largely by the American commander at Corregidor.

Mobilization as part of U.S. Army Forces Far East 
With the threat of war with the Empire of Japan imminent, on July 26, 1941, a new U.S. command in the Far East, the United States Army Forces Far East (USAFFE), was created under Douglas MacArthur (who also became a Philippine Field Marshal). That day, Franklin D. Roosevelt issued a presidential order (6 Fed. Reg. 3825) calling "all the organized military forces of the Government of the Commonwealth of the Philippines" into the service of the U.S. armed forces. Despite the order's wording, it did not order all the military forces of the Philippine Commonwealth government into the service of the United States; only those units and personnel indicated in orders issued by a general officer of the United States Army were mobilized and made an integral part of the USAFFE, and only those members of a unit who physically reported for duty were inducted. With an annual appropriation of almost ₱16 million, the mobilized units trained new Filipino members in defense.

The Philippine Army was drawn from local Christian and Muslim Filipinos, including native Filipinos, Filipino-Mestizos, Spanish-Filipinos, Chinese-Filipinos and Moro-Filipinos. By the time of the Japanese invasion the 10 reserve divisions were about two-thirds mobilized, for a force of 100,000 "poorly equipped and trained" troops. The Philippine Scouts numbered about 12,000. The army was primarily infantry, with some combat engineers and artillery.

At that time there were two regular and ten reserve divisions in the Army of the Philippines, spread across officers in general headquarters, camps in Manila and across the country. This included the North Luzon Force under Major General Jonathan M. Wainwright); the South Luzon Force, activated on December 13, 1941, under Brig. Gen. George M. Parker; the Visayan-Mindanao Force under Maj. Gen. William F. Sharp in the southern islands (61st, 81st, and 101st Infantry Divisions and three other infantry regiments), and the reserve force. The North Luzon Force included the 11th, 21st, and 31st reserve infantry divisions. The South Luzon Force included the 1st (regular) Division and the reserve 41st, 51st and 71st Divisions.

After the war ended, the Army was reorganized into the Philippine Armed Forces.

Commanders

See also 

 Armed Forces of the Philippines
 Military History of the Philippines
 Philippine Army
 Philippine Revolutionary Army
 Luna sharpshooters
 List of Equipment Uniforms of the Philippine Commonwealth Army

References

Works cited

Further reading 

 
 
 
 
 

Military history of the Philippines
Military history of the Philippines during World War II
History
Commonwealth of the Philippines